Royville is an unincorporated community located in Russell County, Kentucky, United States.

The community derives its name from John Roy, a town merchant.

References

Unincorporated communities in Russell County, Kentucky
Unincorporated communities in Kentucky